The large yellow underwing (Noctua pronuba) is a moth, the type species for the family Noctuidae. It is an abundant species throughout the Palearctic realm, one of the most common and most familiar moths of the region. In some years the species is highly migratory with large numbers appearing suddenly in marginal parts of the range.

It is also present in Europe, North Africa, Canary Islands, Middle East, Turkey, Iraq, Iran, Afghanistan, northwest India, Russia, Novosibirsk Oblast, Caucasus, Transcaucasia and Central Asia. It was introduced into North America at Nova Scotia. Since then it has increased its range considerably and has been recorded for Maine since 1985, and then spread throughout the northeast from Vermont and Massachusetts (1989) to New Hampshire (1990), New York, Maryland (1992), and Connecticut (1993). It was first recorded in Pennsylvania in 1998, North Carolina (1997) and west to Colorado (1999), Wyoming (2000), California (2001), British Columbia (2002) and Alaska (2005), Ontario (2017), and Oregon (2021). 

This is a quite large and heavy moth with a wingspan of 50–60 mm. The forewings are quite variable from light brown to almost black. The darker individuals often have a pale streak along the costa. The hindwings are bright orange-yellow with a black sub-terminal band. As with other Noctua species (and numerous other insects), this contrast of bland-on-land and bright-in-flight is used to confuse potential predators. This species flies at night from July to September  and is attracted to light, sometimes in huge numbers. It will also visit flowers such as Buddleia, ragwort, and red valerian.

The larva is green or brown with two rows of black dashes along the back. This is one of the notorious "cutworms", causing fatal damage at the base of virtually any herbaceous plant (some examples listed below), sometimes severing it completely. This ubiquitous species is considered as a garden pest. The species overwinters as a larva and feeds on mild days throughout the winter.

Description in Meyrick
A. pronuba, L. 48-56 mm. Antennae in male ciliated. Forewings ochreous-brown to dark fuscous, sometimes reddish tinged, sometimes partly irrorated with grey-whitish, especially towards costa anteriorly; lines often paler, dark-edged, sometimes faint, subterminal preceded on costa by a blackish mark orbicular and reniform more or less pale-edged, outlined with darker, reniform partly marked with dark grey. Hindwings ochreous-orange; a blackish terminal band. Larva pale green to dull brown; dorsal line pale; subdorsal series of blackish longitudinal marks on 5-12; a pale line beneath these; subspiracular pale; head light brown, dark-marked. See Noctua orbona, the lunar yellow underwing and Noctua comes, lesser yellow underwing for differences between these species and pronuba.
The flight season refers to the British Isles. This may vary in other parts of the range.

Recorded food plants

Allium
Beta – beet
Brassica
Calendula – marigold
Chrysanthemum
Dahlia
Daucus – carrot
Dianthus – carnation
Fragaria – strawberry
Freesia
Gladiolus
Hieracium – hawkweed
Lactuca – lettuce
Lycopersicon – tomato
Plantago – plantain
Poaceae – grasses
Primula
Rhubarb
Solanum – nightshades (including potato and tomato plants)
Spinach
Taraxacum – dandelion
Viola – sweet violet
Vitis – grape

See Robinson, G.S. et al.

References

Chinery, Michael (1986). Collins Guide to the Insects of Britain and Western Europe.
Skinner, Bernard (1984). Colour Identification Guide to Moths of the British Isles.

External links

Lepiforum
Noctua pronuba at funet.fi

Noctua (moth)
Moths described in 1758
Moths of Africa
Moths of Europe
Moths of Iceland
Moths of the Middle East
Moths of North America
Moths of Asia
Taxa named by Carl Linnaeus